In control theory, multiple models is an approach to improve efficiency of adaptive system or observer system. It uses large number of models, which are distributed in the region of uncertainty, and based on the responses of the plant and the models. One model is chosen at every instant, which is closest to the plant according to some metric. The method offers satisfactory performance when no restrictions are put on the number of available models.

Approaches
There are two multiple model methods:
 “Switching” the control input to the plant is based on the fixed model chosen at that instant. It is discontinuous, fast, but coarse.
 “Switching and tuning”, an adaptive model is initialized from the location of the fixed model chosen, and the parameters of the best model determine the control to be used. It is continuous, slow, but accurate.

Applications
Multiple model method can be used for:
 controlling an unknown plant - parameter estimate and  the identification errors can be used collectively to determine the control input to the overall system,
 applying multi observer - significantly improve transients and reduce observer overshoot.

See also 
State observer
Adaptive control

References

General references

 

 

Control theory